Nobanno (Nobānno; lit:  New Feast) is a Bengali harvest celebration usually celebrated with food and dance and music in Bangladesh and in the Indian states of West Bengal, Tripura and Assam's Barak Valley. It is a festival of food; many local preparations of Bengali cuisine like pitha are cooked.

Celebration
The festival is celebrated with mela which are called Nabanna Mela. The villagers and locals from both the major religious groups join the festival with equal participation. The festival gets a lot of support from the creative army of Bengali culture. Several poets, musicians, baul and painters flock to such mass gatherings. There is a famous play written on nabanna by Bijon Bhattacharya which depicts the sad incident of the great Bengal Famine of 1943.
Nowadays the Festival "Nabanna" is celebrating every Bengali year(1st day  of Agrahayan) in Dhaka, organised by Jatiya Nabanna Utshab Udjapan Parshad (National Harvest Festival committee) since 1998. Mr. Shahriar Salam is the Founder and main planner of the organisation. There are huge number of cultural activists, organisations & performing in a day long festival....

People from several villages of Howrah and even from other districts of West Bengal come here. People not only come to visit the Mela. In addition, they participate in many cultural programmes and competitions like 'Pithe Making' (Preparation of different sorts of Bengali Cakes), Seat-and Draw, Senior Citizens' Walking Competition, etc. An "Art-Camp" may attract creative minded people where artists from different states will participate. Some rare items of rural Bengal as "Dhenki" (Old-style Domestic Rice Mill), paddy of different varieties directly from the farmers' house are to be exhibited in the Exhibition ground. You can taste some delicious Bengali dishes like Pati-Sapta, Payesh (the latest addition is 'Vegetable Payesh'), Jilipipi (not Jilipi), etc. during the festival. Bengal's time-honoured culture and heritage will be presented to you in forms of Baul song, Chhou-dance, Jatra, Tarja, Kobi-gaan, etc. These artists come from different parts of the state to perform their talent and expertise in front of thousands of appreciative gatherings. Moreover, you can refurbish your collection of folk arts from the 'exhibition-cum-sale' stalls of handicrafts made by rural artisans.

Social and cultural effects
Several dance and music forms have grown out of the ritual accompanied with the festival. Examples are Chhau, Bihu etc. Also the name nabanna is associated to several rural welfare projects and banks. It has also been associated with the Indian People's Theatre Association (IPTA) movement of Bengali theatre.

The path-breaking production Nabanna of the IPTA in the 1940s, has been a motivating force in the left-tilted political approach of the next few decades on the stage where luminaries like Utpal Dutt will glow with brilliance...

References

Further reading
 
  – outlines rice growing seasons

Bangladeshi culture
Festivals of Bangladeshi culture
Bengali culture
Harvest festivals in India
Festivals in West Bengal
Folk festivals in Bangladesh
Food and drink festivals in Bangladesh
March observances
April observances
Bengali Hindu festivals